William Carr (born 1 June 1976) is an Australian former cricketer. He played six first-class cricket matches for Victoria between 2002 and 2003.

See also
 List of Victoria first-class cricketers

References

External links
 

1976 births
Living people
Australian cricketers
Victoria cricketers
Cricketers from Melbourne